St. John de Britto College is a private Catholic primary and secondary school, located in Lisbon, Lumiar, Portugal. The school was founded by the Society of Jesus in 1947 and its teachings are based on Ignatian pedagogy and spirituality. The school is chartered and has autonomy for an indefinite period.

Notable alumni 
 Ricardo Araújo Pereira - actor and comedian
 Paulo Portas - politician

See also

 Catholic Church in Portugal
 Education in Portugal
 List of Jesuit schools

References  

Jesuit secondary schools in Portugal
Jesuit primary schools in Portugal
Educational institutions established in 1947
1947 establishments in Portugal
Schools in Lisbon